Struuga Landscape Conservation Area was a nature park which was located in Ida-Viru County, Estonia.

The area of the nature park was 1251 ha.

The protected area was founded in 2007 to protect the old rivers ( or ) of Narva River, and theirs biodiversity. In 2021, the protected area was incorporated to Alutaguse National Park.

References

Nature reserves in Estonia
Geography of Ida-Viru County